Louise-Élisabeth de Croÿ de Tourzel (Louise Élisabeth Félicité Françoise Armande Anne Marie Jeanne Joséphine de Croÿ de Tourzel; 11 June 1749 – 15 May 1832) was a French noblewoman and courtier, as the Marquise of Tourzel. She was the Governess of the Children of France from 1789 until 1792. Decades after the French Revolution, Louise-Élisabeth published her memoirs, which presented a unique perspective on the royal family during the French Revolution. She later acquired the title of duchess.

Life
Louise Élisabeth was born in Paris, into the illustrious House of Croÿ during the reign of King Louis XV. Louise’s father was the duke of Havré, Louis Ferdinand Joseph, and her mother was the princess of Montmorency-Luxembourg, Marie Louise. 

Louise Élisabeth was married in 1766, at the age of seventeen, to the Marquis de Tourzel. They enjoyed a happy marriage for twenty years, in which Louise Élisabeth bore six children; her husband was, however, killed in a hunting accident in 1786. She was a staunch supporter of the House of Bourbon, and had this motto engraved on a ring she refused to part with: Lord, save the King, the Dauphin, and his sister!.

French Revolution
After the Storming of the Bastille in 1789, many members of Queen Marie Antoinette’s intimate circle were forced to flee abroad. The duchesse de Polignac, the queen's favourite and the governess to the royal children, was forced to emigrate to Switzerland. Marie Antoinette appointed Louise Élisabeth to the newly vacant post, with particular attention to be paid to the dauphin, Louis-Charles. The marquise was advised to curb the dauphin's fear of loud noises, particularly the barking of the many dogs at Versailles.

After an angry mob of women incited by revolutionaries stormed the Palace of Versailles on 5 October 1789, the marquise accompanied the royal family to live in the Tuileries Palace in Paris. Tourzel's loyalty was strong, and she refused to abandon the royal children as political strife in the nation dramatically increased. She even accompanied the king and his family on the flight to Varennes, for a royalist stronghold in Montmédy. This attempt failed, and the entire party was brought back to Paris.

After the abolition of the monarchy in 1792, Louise Élisabeth was separated from the royal family and imprisoned in the La Force Prison, and soon the Prison Port-Libre. Also imprisoned at the same time was her daughter, Pauline de Tourzel, and Marie Antoinette's personal friend, Princesse de Lamballe. Shortly after their imprisonment, they found themselves targeted in the September Massacres, when thousands of incarcerated people in Paris were massacred by mobs who were trying to get arid of the prisons of jailed aristocrats they suspected of treason. Louise Élisabeth and her daughter were smuggled out of the prison by a mysterious man, but Princesse de Lamballe was not so fortunate. She was murdered, and her severed head was then paraded around the city.  Louise Élisabeth and her daughter were advised by their rescuer, a "Monsieur Hardi", to leave Paris because Pauline had escaped the prison illegally and was in danger of arrest, and they left for the countryside, where they lived incognito in Vincennes and at the property of her son in Aboundant outside of Dreux.

In January 1793, King Louis XVI was executed. In October, the former queen of France, Marie Antoinette, was also sent to the guillotine. Louise Élisabeth was devastated by their deaths, and she was equally shocked to hear of the death of Louis-Charles in 1795. Several times over the coming decades, Louise Élisabeth was accosted by various men pretending to be "Louis XVII of France".

Later years

As soon as Marie-Thérése-Charlotte was allowed visits again by the government, she was among the first who requested to see her in her prison cell in the Temple. It was Louise Élisabeth who informed Marie-Therese that she was to marry her cousin Louis Antoine, Duke of Angoulême, on the request of the latters father. She attended the wedding of Marie-Therese and Louis Antoine in Mitau in the June of 1799, and remained in Mitau for some time. Because of her well-known sympathy for the Bourbon family, she was put under secret surveillance of Napoleon I’s secret police.

During the Bourbon Restoration, Louise Élisabeth was made a duchess by King Charles X. She later published her memoirs, which are an invaluable historical account of the final days of the royal household. Her daughter, Pauline, became a lady-in-waiting to Marie Antoinette's only surviving child, Marie-Thérèse-Charlotte.

In fiction
Louise-Élisabeth de Tourzel has been featured in several novels about the French royal family, including the Marie Antoinette romances by Alexandre Dumas. 

The novels include:

 Trianon, by Elena Maria Vidal

 Madame Royale, by Elena Maria Vidal
 Flaunting, Extravagant Queen, by Jean Plaidy

The character of Louise-Élisabeth appeared in the 1956 French film Marie-Antoinette reine de France.

References

External links

 
 
 Memoirs of the Duchess de Tourzel, Volume I 
 Mémoires de Madame la duchesse de Tourzel, Volume I 

1749 births
1832 deaths
Writers from Paris
Louise-Elisabeth
Governesses to the Children of France
French memoirists
18th-century French people
18th-century French women
19th-century French writers
19th-century French women writers
French women memoirists
Louis XVII
Court of Louis XVI
19th-century memoirists
French duchesses
French marchionesses